Pirates' House is a historic restaurant and tavern established in 1794 located in downtown Savannah, Georgia, United States. A portion of the structure, known as the Herb House, was built in 1853. The structures either side of it developed between 1794 and 1871. The modern restaurant was founded by Herb Traub and Jim Casey in 1953, and is one of Savannah's most popular tourist attractions.

History

The Herb House was built on a ten-acre plot of land located on the east side of James Oglethorpe's  original plan of the city of Savannah. The plot of land was assigned to become a botanical garden that modeled the Chelsea Botanical Garden in London, England. The garden, which was located beyond the bounds of today's buildings, was dedicated to Oglethorpe's trustees, becoming known as the Trustees' Garden. Oglethorpe recruited botanists from around the world to acquire plants for the project, such as cotton, spices, indigo and medicinal herbs. The garden was hoped to bring success in the wine and silk industries and was centered on growing mulberry trees. The soil and weather conditions of Georgia were not compatible with the mulberry trees and it was not successful with wine or silk; however, it did distribute peach trees, for which Georgia is now renowned. The garden was also highly successful in growing cotton, which later became a staple of Georgia's economy.

A building was built on the plot of land in 1853 to house the gardener who worked there. This building was deemed the Herb House. A hay loft, where the gardener slept, was on the second floor of the building. The first floor was used for tools and gardening supplies.

Renovation and ownership
In 1948, Pirates' House and the surrounding land was acquired by The Savannah Gas Company. The building soon caught the interest of Mrs. Hansell Hilyer, wife of the president of the company. She renewed the house museum into the restaurant of the present day. Pirates' House has fifteen dining rooms, can hold up to 120 guests, and serves a variety of southern dishes.

References

External links
 Official Pirates' House website

Restaurants in Savannah, Georgia
Taverns in Georgia (U.S. state)
Treasure Island
Pirate dens and locations
Robert Louis Stevenson
1794 establishments in Georgia (U.S. state)
Savannah Historic District